The Orlando Fire Department is the fire department for the City of Orlando, Florida. It is the only fire department in the State of Florida to have ISO 1 classification, International Fire Accreditation, Emergency Management Accreditation Program certification and ACE accreditation.

Stations and apparatus

References 

Fire departments in Florida
Organizations based in Orlando, Florida
Organizations with year of establishment missing